China Railway Nanning Group, officially abbreviated as CR Nanning or CR-Nanning, formerly, Nanning Railway Administration is a subsidiaries company under the jurisdiction of the China Railway (formerly the Ministry of Railway). It supervises the railway network within Guangxi and Guangdong Provinces. The railway administration was reorganized as a company in November 2017.

History 
January 1, 1953, the establishment of the Liuzhou Railway Authority of Ministry of Railways of the People's Republic of China.
August 29, 1958, Liuzhou Railway Administration changed the Liuzhou Railway Bureau.
November 16, 2007, Liuzhou Railway Bureau officially renamed the Nanning Railway Bureau.

Subordinate Agencies

Passenger segment 
Nanning passenger segment (Liuzhou passenger segment merge to Nanning passenger segment)

Depot 
Nanning Depot
Nanning South Depot
Liuzhou Depot

Locomotive Depot

Existing locomotive depot 
Liuzhou Locomotive Depot
Nanning Locomotive Depot

Revoked locomotive depot 
Guilin Locomotive Depot (Incorporated into Liuzhou Locomotive Depot)
Jinchengjiang Locomotive Depot (Incorporated into Liuzhou Locomotive Depot)
Rong'an Locomotive Depot (Incorporated into Liuzhou Locomotive Depot)
Yulin Locomotive Depot (Incorporated into Nanning Locomotive Depot)

Hub stations
 Nanning
 Liuzhou
 , 
 Guilin
 ,

References

External links 
  (Chinese)

Rail transport in Guangxi
Nanning
 
China Railway Corporation